Kim Lesley Hartman (born 11 January 1952) is an English actress, best known for her role as Private Helga Geerhart in the BBC television sitcom 'Allo 'Allo! (1982–1992).

She was educated at The King's High School for Girls, Warwick. and the Webber Douglas Academy of Dramatic Art, London.

In addition to 'Allo 'Allo!, Hartman's television credits also include Casualty and The Brittas Empire, The Kelly Monteith Show, Fifteen Storeys High, Miss Jones and Son and Grange Hill (3 series). Her stage work includes the West End stage production of 'Allo 'Allo!, Margaret in My Mother Said I Never Should, Vera in Stepping Out, Josie in Steaming (New Zealand), Philippa James in Double Double, Sheila in Relatively Speaking, Jacqueline in Don't Dress for Dinner (West End), Alison in Mum's the Word, Doris Wagstaff in the farce Dry Rot,  Brigit in Sitting Pretty,  Judith Bliss in Hay Fever and Vicky in My Fat Friend.

Radio plays include Lord Sky, Mary Yellan in Jamaica Inn, Daisy Chain, a Sapphire and Steel audio drama and an audio book entitled The Worst Street in London.

Hartman presented a travel programme shown on Travel Channel (UK), Cruising to the Northern Lights.

References

External links
 
 
 
 

1952 births
Living people
Actresses from London
English television actresses
Alumni of the Webber Douglas Academy of Dramatic Art
People educated at The King's High School for Girls
English radio actresses
20th-century English actresses
21st-century English actresses
British comedy actresses